In mathematics, Esakia spaces are special ordered topological spaces introduced and studied by Leo Esakia in 1974. Esakia spaces play a fundamental role in the study of Heyting algebras, primarily by virtue of the Esakia duality—the dual equivalence between the category of Heyting algebras and the category of Esakia spaces.

Definition

An Esakia space is a Priestley space  such that for each clopen subset  of the topological space , the set  is also clopen.

Equivalent definitions

There are several equivalent ways to define Esakia spaces.

Theorem: Given that  is a Stone space, the following conditions are equivalent:

(i)  is an Esakia space.

(iv)  is closed for each , the least closed set containing an up-set is an up-set, and the least up-set containing a closed set is closed.

Since Priestley spaces can be described in terms of spectral spaces, the Esakia property can be expressed in spectral space terminology as follows:
The Priestley space corresponding to a spectral space  is an Esakia space if and only if the closure of every constructible subset 

Esakia morphisms

Let  and  be partially ordered sets and let  be an order-preserving map.

Theorem: The following conditions are equivalent:

(1)  is a bounded morphism.

(2)  for each .

(3)  for each .

Let  and  be Esakia spaces and let  be a map. The map  is called an Esakia morphism if  is a continuous bounded morphism.

Notes

References

 Esakia, L. (1974). Topological Kripke models. Soviet Math. Dokl., 15 147–151.
 Esakia, L. (1985). Heyting Algebras I. Duality Theory (Russian). Metsniereba, Tbilisi.
 

General topology